Campbell Robert Johnstone (born 7 January 1980) is a former New Zealand international rugby union player who played for Biarritz Olympique in the Top 14. In December 2012 he joined Welsh regional team Ospreys until the end of the 2012/13 season, going straight into their 38-man Heineken Cup squad and making his debut the same week against Toulouse.

He played for the All Blacks in 2005 in which he played three tests and made his debut against Fiji and his last test was against the British and Irish Lions. His position was prop.

Personal life
On 30 January 2023, Johnstone revealed in an interview with Hilary Barry on New Zealand television show Seven Sharp that he is gay, making him the first openly gay All Black.

References

External links
 Campbell Johnstone | Rugby Database Profile
Crusaders profile

1980 births
New Zealand international rugby union players
Living people
People from Waipukurau
New Zealand rugby union players
Biarritz Olympique players
Ospreys (rugby union) players
Expatriate rugby union players in France
Tasman rugby union players
Canterbury rugby union players
Crusaders (rugby union) players
New Zealand expatriate rugby union players
Expatriate rugby union players in Wales
Expatriate rugby union players in Russia
Expatriate rugby union players in Romania
New Zealand expatriate sportspeople in Wales
New Zealand expatriate sportspeople in France
New Zealand expatriate sportspeople in Russia
New Zealand expatriate sportspeople in Romania
Rugby union props
People educated at Lindisfarne College, New Zealand
Rugby union players from the Hawke's Bay Region
Gay sportsmen
New Zealand LGBT sportspeople
LGBT rugby union players
21st-century LGBT people